The Peugeot Quark was a concept car from Peugeot, similar to a four-wheeled motorcycle or a quad bike. The Quark was unveiled at the 2004 Paris Motor Show and subsequently shown at the 2005 Amsterdam Motor Show. 

It utilised hydrogen fuel cells and had an electric motor on each wheel. All four motors combined gave the Quark . It could drive approximately  before requiring refuelling.

The Quark was not intended for production and can now be seen in Paris at the Cité des Sciences et de l'Industrie.

References

External links

Quark
Hydrogen cars